Kholeh Kahush-e Olya (also Romanized as Kholeh Kāhūsh-e ‘Olyā; also known as Kholeh Gūsh-e ‘Olyā) is a village in Gurani Rural District, Gahvareh District, Dalahu County, Kermanshah Province, Iran. At the 2006 census, its population was 43, in 10 families.

References 

Populated places in Dalahu County